Los Angeles Central Business District may refer to:

Central Business District, Los Angeles (1880-1899)
 Downtown Los Angeles - Central Business District, present day